Socofer is the name for the railway construction company that before 1968 was known as Établissements Billard.

Production 
  narrow gauge locomotives for:
 The French Army (type SCF 303)
 Leisure parks.
 Tourist railways.
 Narrow gauge carriages for touristic railways.

Preserved rolling stock 
 Two narrow gauge locomotives, built 1968, ex French Army, at APPEVA (T28 et T29).
 Two narrow gauge locomotives, built 1981, ex Chemin de fer des Chanteraines.
 A narrow gauge locomotive, built 1981, at the leisure park of Port aux Cerises.
 A narrow gauge locomotive, built 2000, on the Chemin de fer du Creusot.
 Two carriages, on the Chemin de fer des Chanteraines and the leisure resort of Port aux Cerises.
 A type T75 locomotive built by Socofer, not Billard, between 1960 and 1965 at the Train de Rillé (apparently left there circa 2000)

External links 
 Socofer website

Locomotive manufacturers of France